The Gârda Seacă is a left tributary of the river Arieșul Mare in Romania. It discharges into the Arieșul Mare in Gârda de Sus.

References

Rivers of Romania
Rivers of Alba County